Alexander Wright or Alex Wright may refer to:

Sportspeople
Alex Wright (born 1975), German wrestler
Alex Wright (footballer, born 1897), Scottish player for Aberdeen, Heart of Midlothian, Morton; player manager for Queen of the South
Alex Wright (footballer, born 1925) (1925–1999), Scottish player for Hibernian, Barnsley, Tottenham, Bradford Park Avenue and Falkirk
Alex Wright (footballer, born 1930) (1930–2000), Scottish football player and manager
Alexander Wright (American football) (born 1967), American football player and college coach
Alex Wright (American football), American football player
Alex Wright (racewalker) (born 1990), Irish race walker

Other people
Alexander Wright (VC) (1826–1858), Irish soldier in the British Army and Victoria Cross recipient
Alex Wright (musician) (born 1980), Canadian musician and producer
Alex Wright (author), American writer and information architect

See also
Alexander Matthew Wright (presenter) (born 1965), English television presenter and journalist
Al Wright (disambiguation)